Chirino is a surname. Notable people with the surname include:

José Leonardo Chirino (1754–1796), revolutionary
Martín Chirino (1925–2019), Spanish sculptor
Pedro Chirino (1557–1635), Spanish historian and Jesuit missionary
Rogelio Chirino (born 1946), Cuban sprint canoeist
Willy Chirino (born 1947), American singer
Pedro Almíndez Chirino, Spanish conquistador

See also
Chirinos